Ruslan Burlakov (Ukrainian: Руслан Бурлаков) is a paralympic swimmer from Ukraine, competing mainly in category S11 events.

Ruslan competed at the 2000 Summer Paralympics as part of the Ukrainian swimming team. She won bronze medals in both the 50m and 100m freestyle events. She also finished fifth in the 100m backstroke, fourth in the 200m medley, and was part of the Ukrainian  medley team that finished fourth.

References

External links
 

Year of birth missing (living people)
Living people
Ukrainian female freestyle swimmers
Paralympic swimmers of Ukraine
Paralympic bronze medalists for Ukraine
Paralympic medalists in swimming
Swimmers at the 2000 Summer Paralympics
Medalists at the 2000 Summer Paralympics
S11-classified Paralympic swimmers